Bear Lake is a lake located by McKeever, New York. Fish species present in the lake are brook trout, white sucker, sunfish, and brown bullhead. There is access via trail off-road east of McKeever.

References

Lakes of Herkimer County, New York